Charles Bentham was an English shipwright.  In 1727 the Amsterdam Admiralty, brought in Bentham and two other English shipwrights (John May and Thomas Davis) to work for them in improving ship design and avoiding the wreck after wreck they had recently been suffering.  Bentham created moulds and draughts which became very influential in the standardisation of the Dutch ships from the 1740s onwards.

References

External links
http://findarticles.com/p/articles/mi_qn4158/is_19950705/ai_n13992711
http://www.angelfire.com/vt/sneuper/vlootlijsten.htm

English shipwrights
Year of death unknown
Year of birth unknown